Gonçalo Matias Ramos (born 20 June 2001) is a Portuguese professional footballer who plays as a forward for Primeira Liga club Benfica and the Portugal national team.

Born in Olhão, Ramos came through Benfica's youth academy. He began playing for Benfica B in 2019 and was promoted to the first team a year later. Following three seasons with the first team, Ramos established himself as an integral player for the club.

Ramos is a former Portugal youth international, representing his country at various levels, including the under-19 team that finished as runners-up at the 2019 UEFA European Championship and the under-21 team that finished as runners-up at the 2021 European Championship. He made his senior international debut in 2022.

Club career

Early career
Born in Olhão, Algarve on 20 June 2001, Ramos started his football career in the youth ranks of local side Olhanense in 2009, before joining Loulé in 2011. Shortly Ramos had several trials with Sporting CP at age of 9, but was rejected due to his slight frame, leading him to join their crosstown rivals youth system Benfica in 2013 at the age of 12.

Benfica

2019–22: Rise to the first team

On 13 January 2019, he made his professional debut with Benfica's reserve team as an 84th-minute substitute for Nuno Tavares in a 3–2 home loss to Braga B in LigaPro. On 21 July 2020, he made first-team debut with Benfica as an 85th-minute substitute for Pizzi in a 4–0 away win over Desportivo das Aves in the Primeira Liga, netting a brace in 8 minutes. During that season, Ramos played in the 2019–20 UEFA Youth League, in which he was a key part of Benfica reaching the final of the competition, lost to Real Madrid (3–2), in which he scored a brace in the finals; he finished as joint-top scorer in the tournament with eight goals. On 7 October 2020, he agreed to a contract extension to 2025.

After a promising 2020–21 season with the B team, which he scored eleven goals in twelve games, Ramos was given a run in the first-team at the start of the 2021–22 season by manager Jorge Jesus, starting in a 2–0 home victory over Spartak Moscow in the third qualifying round of the UEFA Champions League. Following the arrival of Roman Yaremchuk and the return of Darwin Núñez from injury, Ramos found limited first-team minutes, leading him to pursue a move out of the club in the winter transfer window. With the arrival of interim manager Nélson Veríssimo in January 2022, who had previously coached him at the B team, Ramos began playing more regularly, and reignited his form, scoring seven goals and adding two assists. His versatility enabled him to play in various positions in attack, which the new coach found useful.

On 13 April, he scored his first UEFA Champions League goal in a 3–3 away draw against Liverpool at Anfield in the second leg of the UEFA Champions League quarter-finals tie. In doing so, he became the second youngest player (aged 20 years and 297 days) to score for the club in the final phases of the competition, though Benfica were eliminated after losing to Liverpool 6–4 on aggregate.

2022–23: Breakthrough season

Ramos began the 2022–23 season by scoring his first career hat-trick on 2 August in a 4–1 home win over Midtjylland in the first leg of the 2022–23 UEFA Champions League third qualifying round. His prolific form saw him score two more goals and provided two assists, as part of a partnership with newly signed teammate David Neres, including a goal and an assist in the 3–0 home win over Dynamo Kiev in the second leg of the 2022–23 UEFA Champions League play-off round, helping his side qualify to the tournament. On 2 November, he scored his first UEFA Champions League goal of the season, opening Benfica's 6–1 away win against Maccabi Haifa in their last 2022–23 UEFA Champions League group stage match, to ensure the club's qualification to the round of sixteen, as group winners. After scoring five goals in five matches, he was named the league's Player of the Month and Forward of the Month for the months of October and November.

On 15 January 2023, Ramos scored a brace to help the hosts secure a 2–2 draw against crosstown rivals Sporting CP in the Derby de Lisboa, being named man of the match. In doing so, he became the second youngest player (aged 21 years and 183 days) to score a brace in the derby, since António Mendes (aged 21 years and 30 days) in 1958. On 7 March, in the second leg of Champions League round-of-16, Ramos scored a brace in a 5–1 home win against Club Brugge, becoming the youngest Portuguese player (aged 21 years and 260 days) to score twice in a Champions League knockout stage match.

International career

Youth career and early senior career
With the Portugal under-17s, Ramos participated in the 2018 UEFA European Under-17 Championship in England. In this competition, he played two matches, scoring a goal against Slovenia in a group stage exit.

Ramos was part of the Portugal team that finished runners-up to Spain at the 2019 UEFA European Under-19 Championship in Armenia. He was the top scorer with four goals in five appearances, including a hat-trick in a 4–0 win against the Republic of Ireland in the semi-finals.

On 12 November 2020, Ramos won his first cap for the under-21 side, scoring the third goal on his debut in a 3–0 victory in Belarus for the 2021 European Championship qualification campaign. In March 2021, Ramos took part in the 2021 UEFA European Under-21 Championship, helping Portugal finish as runners-up, after losing in the final 1–0 to Germany.

On 20 September 2022, Ramos was called up to the senior team for the first time, as a replacement for Benfica team-mate Rafa Silva, who retired from international football, for the upcoming 2022–23 UEFA Nations League matches against the Czech Republic and Spain.

2022 FIFA World Cup
On 10 November 2022, Ramos was named in Portugal's 26-man squad for the 2022 FIFA World Cup in Qatar. He made his senior international debut in a friendly against Nigeria on 17 November, scoring the third goal and assisting the fourth in a 4–0 win. On 6 December, Portugal manager Fernando Santos started Ramos ahead of Cristiano Ronaldo in the team's round of 16 game against Switzerland. Ramos scored a hat-trick and provided an assist in Portugal's 6–1 victory, becoming the first player to score a World Cup knockout stage hat-trick since Tomáš Skuhravý in 1990. He also became the first player to score a hat-trick in his first World Cup start since Miroslav Klose in 2002. Portugal employed the same strategy in the quarter-finals against Morocco, with Ramos starting once again. Portugal lost 1–0, however, with Morocco becoming the first CAF nation ever to reach the World Cup semi-finals.

Style of play
Nicknamed "O Feiticeiro" ("The Wizard") and "O Pistoleiro" ("The Gunman"), Ramos is known for his versatility, being capable of playing in several offensive positions, such as a striker, or second striker. Ramos usually drops deep, to help his team build their attacking play by bring his teammates into play, and create chances for other players. Due to his awareness and willingness to follow instructions, he understands how to rotate positions in ways in which to benefit the ball-holder with his movement, short or long passes. When he is offering short, he aims to be positive in his control of the ball, he attempts to open his body up each time, with either foot, being able to hold up the ball and act as his team focal point in attack.

During his second season at Benfica, under Roger Schmidt, Ramos has been deployed as a striker in a 4–2–3–1 formation. His ability to attack space and create further space both inside and outside the penalty area with his movement is what made the move to the centre a more natural progression. Ramos is good at picking up positions between the opposition's defenders and then exploiting space behind the defensive line. He presses with intent and is not afraid to put himself about against the opposition. Ramos usually links up with the midfield and makes proactive movements which always can put a striker in a goal-scoring position more often rather than standing around and waiting for the service, similar to Karim Benzema.

Personal life
Ramos' father, Manuel Ramos, originally from Amareleja, in Alentejo Region, is also a former Portugal youth international who represented Farense among other Portuguese clubs.

Career statistics

Club

International

Portugal score listed first, score column indicates score after each Ramos goal.

Honours
Benfica
Taça de Portugal runner-up: 2020–21
Taça da Liga runner-up: 2021–22

Portugal U19
UEFA European Under-19 Championship runner-up: 2019

Portugal U21
UEFA European Under-21 Championship runner-up: 2021

Individual
 Cosme Damião Awards – Revelation of the Year: 2021
Primeira Liga's Player of the Month: October/November 2022
Primeira Liga's Forward of the Month: October/November 2022
Liga Portugal 2's Forward of the Month: September/October 2021 
SJPF Young Player of the Month: March 2022, August/September 2022 
UEFA European Under-19 Championship Golden Boot: 2019
 UEFA Youth League top goalscorer: 2019–20

References

External links

 Profile at the S.L. Benfica website
 

2001 births
Living people
People from Olhão
Portuguese footballers
Association football forwards
Liga Portugal 2 players
Primeira Liga players
S.C. Olhanense players
S.L. Benfica B players
S.L. Benfica footballers
Portugal youth international footballers
Portugal international footballers
Sportspeople from Faro District
2022 FIFA World Cup players